Viešvilė is a small town in Tauragė County, in western Lithuania. According to the 2011 census, the town has a population of 843 people.

Gallery

References

Towns in Lithuania
Towns in Tauragė County